Calshot Activities Centre is located on Calshot Spit near Southampton. Indoor facilities include the oldest indoor velodrome in Britain, a dry ski slope and a climbing wall.

Velodrome
Calshot Velodrome is the oldest indoor cycling venue in the UK. It is located inside an old aircraft hangar, is unheated and has a reputation for being rather cold. The current wooden velodrome was built in 1996 to replace an older slightly smaller wooden track.

The former wooden track was a shortened version of the London six-day racing track used at Earls Court in 1967 (not to be confused with a similar track used at Wembley from 1968 to 1980).

The current track is 142.85 metres long with bankings of 45° and straights at approximately 20°.

Calshot Winter Track League, run under British Cycling rules, is held weekly from October to February.

References

External links
Calshot Activities Centre

Velodromes in England
Sports venues in Hampshire
Cycle racing in England